Bambaia may refer to:

The sculptor Agostino Busti
Bambaia, Bafata, Guinea-Bissau
Bambaia, Oio, Guinea-Bissau
Bambaia, Quinara, Guinea-Bissau